The Duluth Masonic Center is a historic Masonic Temple in Duluth, Minnesota, United States.  It was built in 1905 and continues to be Duluth's primary venue for Freemasonry.  The building was listed on the National Register of Historic Places in 2015 under the name Duluth Masonic Temple for its significance in the themes of art and social history.  It was nominated for being the longstanding focal point of Duluth's most influential fraternal organization.  It was also nominated for the Egyptian-style frieze and 80 hand-painted stage backdrops (the largest operable collection still in Minnesota) contained in its Scottish Rite auditorium.

See also
 List of Masonic buildings in the United States
 National Register of Historic Places listings in St. Louis County, Minnesota

References

External links

 Duluth Masonic Center

1905 establishments in Minnesota
Beaux-Arts architecture in Minnesota
Buildings and structures in Duluth, Minnesota
Clubhouses on the National Register of Historic Places in Minnesota
Masonic buildings completed in 1905
Masonic buildings in Minnesota
National Register of Historic Places in St. Louis County, Minnesota